Kentucky Route 111 (KY 111) is a  state highway in Kentucky. It runs from U.S. Route 60 (US 60) east of Owingsville to KY 32 southeast of Flemingsburg via Hillsboro.

Major intersections

References

0111
Transportation in Bath County, Kentucky
Transportation in Fleming County, Kentucky